James Makumbi (12 September 1942 – 8 January 2018) was a Ugandan physician and politician.

He held a longtime post at the Mulago National Referral Hospital in Kampala, before he was named Minister of Health. In February 1995, during his tenure as health minister, Makumbi was kidnapped by the Federal Democratic Alliance forces and released after three days. Makumbi then represented Baale in the Parliament until 2001, when he was defeated by Sulaiman Madada. The Uganda People's Defence Force then named Makumbi one of its ten representatives in eighth parliament, in office between 2006 and 2011. He died on 8 January 2018, at a hospital in Kayunga.

References

1942 births
2018 deaths
20th-century Ugandan physicians
Members of the Parliament of Uganda
Health ministers of Uganda
21st-century Ugandan politicians